Vietnam Helicopters (VNH), formally the Vietnam Helicopter Corporation, also known by its military designation Corps 18, is a transportation business owned by the Vietnam Ministry of National Defense. It operates helicopters to transport cargo, train pilots and export/import devices in the aviation industry. It also offers tourist transportation.

History

The Company was founded on April 20, 1979. The first flight squad of the Vietnam Air Force for oil and gas services was set up on September 13, 1983. In March 1985, Helicopter Vietnam was established. In 1989, the Service Flight Corporation of Vietnam was established by the Vietnamese Government with Northern Service Flight Company and Southern Service Flight Company as subsidiaries. 

In 2007, the Service Flight Corporation of Vietnam expanded with a new subsidiary, Hai Au Company, in addition to Northern Service Flight Company as well as Southern Service Flight Company. It has one joint venture, Bien Hoa Helicopters, a maintenance and repair company. In 2010, Service Flight Corporation of Vietnam was renamed the Vietnam Helicopter Corporation.

Operations
VNH operates a fleet of 28 aircraft with the ability to carry from 4 to 24 passengers .

Petroleum exploration 
VNH is the first company in Vietnam to provide aviation transport for employees in the oil and gas industry in Vietnam. Over three decades, VNH has provided aviation transport services for more than 30 companies, including Vietsovpetro, Premier Oil, BHP, Petronas, BP and Chevron.

Charter flights 
VNH flies 50+ routes to destinations such as Hạ Long, Cat Bi, Móng Cái, Lào Cai, Sa Pa, Hòa Bình, Thanh Hóa, Vinh, Huế, Da Nang, Vũng Tàu, Côn Đảo, Cà Mau and Phú Quốc.

Pilot training 
VNH Training Center is Ministry of Defense-certified as a training center. It trains pilots, ground services staff, aviation engineering staff, and pilots on its modern group of aircraft including the EC225, Super Puma AS-322 L2, EC155 B1, Mi-172, and the Mi-17-1V.The VNH Training Center has trained its own staff along with the Vietnam People's Air Force, and the Vietnam People's Navy. Trainers themselves were trained by helicopter companies in Hong Kong and Malaysia.

Missing in Action program 
The MIA program started as flights to search for missing Americans following the Vietnam War. The MIA program was established between the United States and the VNH on 18 April 1990. VNH has flown more than 100 searches throughout Vietnam, including many over dangerous regions and in hazardous weather conditions. These actions contributed to the normalization of United States–Vietnam relations.

Aeronautical engineering services 
The aeronautical engineering centers of VNH: Northern Vietnam Helicopter Company, Southern Service Flight Company and Helicopter Technical Services Corporation (Helitechco) are licensed by the AMO aircraft maintenance organization of Civil Aviation Administration of Vietnam. Helitechco is the only engineering center in Asia that has been ratified by the MIL Institute to maintain Russian-made Mi-type aircraft. More than 200 CAAV certified-staff are undergoing training at universities and colleges in domestic and international aviation. Engineers and technical staff attend courses in the operation and maintenance for helicopters in Russia and France as well as planes including the EC225, Super Puma AS-322 L2, EC155 B1, Mi-172 and Mi-17-1V. Helitechco and aeronautical engineering centers of VNH can:

Overhaul Mi-type of plane with technical maintenance for 500 hours
Technical maintenance for more than 2200 hours for the EC225, Super Puma AS-322 L2 and EC155 B1.
Accessory maintenance for Eurocopter and Mi planes

Other services

 Tourism, aerial photography, cargo sling; MEDEVAC, search and rescue
 Subcontracting operations services, pilots and mechanics for other helicopter owners
 National security and defense
 General businesses: office and warehouse leasing; supply and transportation of aviation fuel; forwarding logistics services

Leaders

 General director: Hà Tiến Dũng
 Political commissar: Vi Công Dũng
 Vice general director: Kiều Đặng Hùng
 Vice general director: Trần Đình Nam

Fleet

 Eurocopter EC225
 Eurocopter AS332 L2 Super Puma
 AugustaWestland AW189
 Eurocopter EC155 B1
 Mi-172
 Mi-17-1V
 Cabri G2
 Eurocopter EC130T2
 Bell 505 Jet Ranger X

Subsidiaries

 Northern Vietnam Helicopter Company
 Central Vietnam Helicopter Company
 Southern Vietnam Helicopter Company

Achievements

 January 31, 1989: First flight to the Dan Queen oil rig of Bow Valley Energy (Canada) of flight crew UH1A
 1985: Flight contract with Vietsovpetro
 1989: Initial oil company service
 1992: MIA program
 1994: Shareholder of Military Commercial Joint Stock Bank
 1997: Becomes leader of the Vietnam helicopter services market
 1999: President of Vietnam issues Third Military Exploit Order enabling training for foreign pilots
 2000: Supply planes, pilots and mechanics for oil services in Norway
 2005: Transfer from Vietnam People's Air Force to Ministry of Defense (Vietnam)
 2009: Socialist Republic of Vietnam give the title Hero of Labor 
 2014: President of Vietnam issues second Military Exploit Order

References

External links
 Official website of Vietnam Helicopter Corporation
 
 

Airlines of Vietnam
Helicopter airlines
Vietnamese companies established in 1979
Airlines established in 1979